The Bellboy and the Playgirls is a 1962 American film by Francis Ford Coppola and Jack Hill. The film is a re-edited version of a West German film of 1958 originally titled  , directed by Fritz Umgelter with Coppola and Hill shooting nudity inserted into the film for an American release.

Plot
Dinah, an actress, refuses to be a part of seduction scene in front of a live audience. The director, Gregor, tries to convince her to complete the scene by telling her stories of sexual relations over the centuries. In the end, Dinah decides to complete the filming.

Coppola inserted scenes to the original German plot, adding the bellboy, George, who tries to spend some time with a room full of women.

Production
The German production starring Karin Dor and Willy Fritsch was in black and white but Coppola said that he filmed around 15 minutes of footage in 3D and in color to add to the American release. The new footage featured nude women and took Coppola a few days to complete. Coppola said that the project was "adding five three-minute nudie sketches in color to a stupid German movie that had been shot in black-and-white". Al Locatelli designed the sets for the new segments while Jack Hill was the cinematographer. June Wilkinson, a Playboy Bunny, is featured in the segments. The 3-D footage was shot in Optavision and supervised by Richard Kay.

During the production one of the girls stated to Coppola that she was only 17 and that her father was going to kill her. Coppola responded with, "Well, you can keep your bra on," which resulted in him being reprimanded by the producer after he saw the completed film. Hill received $25 for his work on the film and Coppola received $250. Coppola was a student at the University of California, Los Angeles film school and his classmates did not agree with his choice of going into exploitation films. Coppola said, "I was called a cop-out, because I was willing to compromise".

The film print was believed to be lost after the film's initial release in 1962 and subsequent release on videotape but a collector of Coppola memorabilia had a print of the film. The book Godfather: The Intimate Francis Ford Coppola states that "Coppola's color footage is easily identifiable in the finished film" and that "the five Coppola sequences add up to nearly fifty minutes of screen time". A short time after the film's release, Coppola started working under Roger Corman.

Release
The film's 3-D footage has been released by "3-D Rarities" on Blu-ray in a compilation entitled "3-D Rarities". The version included on the Blu-ray contains no nudity.

See also
 List of American films of 1962

References

External links
 
 

1958 films
1962 films
1958 comedy films
1962 comedy films
American multilingual films
German multilingual films
American comedy films
German comedy films
West German films
1960s English-language films
1960s German-language films
Films directed by Fritz Umgelter
Films directed by Francis Ford Coppola
Films with screenplays by Francis Ford Coppola
American independent films
German independent films
Films partially in color
Alternative versions of films
1950s American films
1960s American films
1950s German films
1960s German films